Feudalism in contemporary Pakistan usually refers to the power and influence of large landowning families, particularly through very large estates and in more remote areas. 
The adjective "feudal" in the context of Pakistan has been used to mean "a relatively small group of politically active and powerful landowners". "Feudal attitude" refers to "a combination of arrogance and entitlement".
According to the Pakistan Institute of Labor Education and Research (PILER), five percent of agricultural households in Pakistan own nearly two-thirds of Pakistan's farmland.
 

Large joint families in Pakistan may possess hundreds or even thousands of acres of land, while making little or no direct contribution to agricultural production, which is handled by "peasants or tenants who live at subsistence level". Landlord power may be based on control over local people through debt bondage passed down "generation after generation", and power over the "distribution of water, fertilisers, tractor permits and agricultural credit", which in turn gives them influence over the "revenue, police and judicial administration" of local government.  In recent times, particularly "harsh" feudalism has existed in "rural Sindh", Balochistan, "some parts of Southern Punjab". Pakistan's "major political parties" have been called "feudal-oriented", and as of 2007, "more than two-thirds of the National Assembly" (Lower House) and most of the key executive posts in the provinces were held by "feudals", according to scholar Sharif Shuja.

Some prominent landed families in Pakistan consist of the Jats, Rajputs, Nawabs, Khans, Nawabzadas, Mansabdars, Mazari tribe, Arbabs, Makhdooms, and the Sardars. Explanations for the power of "feudal" landowning families that has waned in other post-colonial societies such as India and Japan include lack of land reform in Pakistan.

Criticism and analysis

Critics of feudalism have complained of a "culture of feudal impunity", where local police will refuse to pursue charges against an influential landowning family even when murder or mayhem have been committed; 
of abuse of power by some landlords who may place enemies in "private prisons" and "enslave" local people through debt bondage; 
the harming of "progress and prosperity" by feudals who discourage the education of their "subjects" for fear it will weaken feudal power; 
the giving of "space" to extremists who peasants turn to in the search for deliverance from the cruelty of feudal lords;
and an agriculture sector made stagnant by absentee landlordism.

Others have complained that Pakistan has developed a "fixation" on feudalism (Michael Kugelman); that it has become a scapegoat for Pakistan's problems, frequently denounced but not seriously studied (Eqbal Ahmed); a "favorite boogie of the urban educated elites";
or that it does not exist because South Asia never developed large concentrations of land ownership or a feudal class, and what is called feudal in Pakistan is merely a "rural gentry", who are "junior partners" to those who actually hold power (Haider Nizamai).  
“Feudalism serves as the whipping boy of Pakistan’s intelligentsia. Yet, to my knowledge few serious studies have been published on the nature and extent of feudal power in Pakistan, and none to my knowledge on the hegemony which feudal culture enjoys in this country.” Nicolas Martin's work is in this respect an exception, although he argues that it is politically influential landlords, and not all landlords, who wield the despotic and arbitrary powers that are often attributed to the landed classes as a whole.

Despite its political influence, feudalism has become so unpopular in public expression and the media that "feudal lords" are denounced even by some from "feudal" families (such as Shehbaz Sharif).

In media portrayals, the very popular 1975 Pakistan Television (PTV) series Waris centered around a feudal lord (Chaudhry Hashmat) who rules his fiefdom, "with an iron grip".

Muhajirs are the only group in Pakistan which despise the landownership system and often have been great critics of feudalism.

History

In Mughal Empire

"It was Akbar not the British colonizers who left us this parasitical curse".
When the British first set foot on the Undivided India, the Mughals were in rule over most part of the region. As a part of their revenue administration was the mansabdari system through which they regulated control over the land revenue of the country. This system, introduced by Mughal Emperor Akbar, remained in place from the late 16th Century (dates vary between 1575 and 1595) till the fall of the Mughal Empire.A Brief History of British Land Acquisition in India

Chronology

1757 – Battle of Plassey , First battle fought by British East India company which led to the removal of the independent ruler of Bengal-Bihar and placement of a ruler more amicable to the company.

1764 – Battle of Buxar , defeat of Mughal Emperor Shah Alam II and his allies, forces him to grant diwani (revenue collection) rights of Bengal and Bihar to the British East India company

1793 – Local rule(Nizamat) in Bengal-Bihar abolished and British East India company took over control of governing the region. Cornwallis Code, Permanent Settlement Act introduced. Sending portion of revenue to Mughal Emperor stopped as well.

1761 - 1848 Sikh Misles Grip on Zamindar, A Sikh Jazia was introduced on zamindars.

1858 – British Raj Begins

1887 – Punjab Tenancy Act 1887

1901 – Land Alienation Act

As the chronology above shows, the acquisition of land by the British was a gradual process, dictated by their military conquests over the Undivided India. This acquisition of lands – and its pattern – determined the method of revenue collection that the colonial power opted for, beginning with the diwani, the first time the British gained the right to collect revenue from local land. In due time, with the introduction of the British Raj, they would stamp their legal authority over the Undivided India by introducing a number of reforms that would systematically create a new breed of intermediaries in the revenue system.

Under colonial rule

Difference from Modern Feudalism

Often criticized for being the root of our modern feudal system, the mansabdari system was in fact different in many essential ways. First and foremost, the system granted ownership on a non-hereditary transferable basis. The officials, mansabdars, who were granted the job of overseeing of the land, never owned their mansabs but were only granted a share of its earnings as a reward for their work. Thus, since they never owned the land, they did not have the right to pass it on to their offspring, either. This non-ownership of land is the essential difference between modern feudalism and the Mughal mansabdari system.

Mansabdars turn into Petty Chiefs

However, after the fall of the Mughal Empire, these mansabdars, turned into de facto hereditary landlords and petty chiefs of their mansabs. With the Mughal ruler gone, there was no one to stop them from doing so. But, sadly for them, soon enough, a new force was to gain control of their land – the British.

In independent Pakistan

Almost half of Pakistan's Gross Domestic Product and the bulk of its export earnings are derived from the agricultural sector, which is controlled by a few thousand feudal families. With this concentration of economic power, they also have considerable political power.

The leadership of the Pakistan Muslim League, the political party that established Pakistan in 1947, was dominated primarily by feudal landowners such as the Taluqdars, Zamindars, Chaudharys, Rajas, Rais, Mahers, Maliks, Khans, Jagirdars, Nawab and Sardars. The sole exception were the Jinnahs.

During the '50s and the '60s, the feudal families retained control over national affairs through the bureaucracy and military. In 1971, they assumed direct power as Zulfikar Ali Bhutto was from of a very large landowning family and retained it until the military regained power. Nawab  Malik Amir Mohammad Khan, a Awan, was Nawab of Kalabagh and remained governor of West Pakistan from 1960-1966.

As of 2009, the Prime Minister,  Yousuf Raza Gilani, is a major landowner from South Punjab (Multan) and from a long-standing political family. The President Asif Ali Zardari, known derisively as Mr. 10%, is a large landowner from Sindh. Hamid Nasir Chattha (former Speaker of the National Assembly of Pakistan) family´s has held power for decades in Gujranwala-hafizabad districts as the Chief of the Chattha Feudals. Shah Mehmood Qureshi hails from a prominent feudal Sufi family in Multan and is also followed as a religious saint.

Thus, large landowners have dominated Pakistan's politics since the country's inception.

See also
The State of Bonded Labor in Pakistan
Indian feudalism
Politics of Pakistan
Agriculture in Pakistan#Land distribution and land reform
Islamic economics in Pakistan#Land reform and Islamisation
Nazim Jokhio murder case
General:
Feudalism
Medhara (Zamindari)

References

Further reading
Ansari, Sarah. 1992. Sufi Saints and State Power: The Pirs of Sind, 1843-1947. Cambridge University Press.
Alavi, Hamza. 1980. "India: Transition from Feudalism to Colonial Capitalism." Journal of Contemporary India, 10, 359–399.
Cheesman, David. 1997. Landlord power and rural indebtedness in colonial Sind, 1865-1901. Routledge.
Coulborn, Rushton. 1968. "Feudalism, Brahmanism and the Intrusion of Islam upon Indian History." Comparative Studies in Society and History, vol. 10, no. 3 (April), 356–374.
Gopal, K. K. 1962. "Feudal Composition of Army in Early Medieval India." Journal of the Andhra Historical Research Society, 28.
Gopal, Lallanji. 1963. "On Some Problems of Feudalism in Ancient India." Annals of the Bhandarkar Oriental Research Institute, 44, 1-32.
Habib, Irfan. 1974. "The Social Distribution of Landed Property in Pre-British India (a historical survey)." Historical Probings in Memory of D. D. Kosambi, 264–316. Editors R. S. Sharma, and V. Jha. New Delhi: Peoples Publishing House.
Herring, Ronald J. 1979. "Zulfikar Ali Bhutto and the 'Eradication of Feudalism' in Pakistan". Comparative Studies in Society and History, 21, 519–557. doi:10.1017/S0010417500013165.
Mohmand, Shandana Khan & Gazdar, Haris. 2007. Social Structures in Rural Pakistan. Asian Development Bank.
Mukhia, Harbans. 1981. "Was there Feudalism in Indian History?" Journal of Peasant Studies, vol. 8, no. 3, 273–310.
Naim Ullah, Mohammed. 2003. Pakistan Under the Stranglehold of Feudalism (Pakistan Jagirdari Zamindari Nizam Ke Shikajije Men): A Nation Under the Agony of Fundamentalism. Rehmat Publications.
Pearson, Michael N. 1985. "Land, Noble and Ruler in Mughal India." In Feudalism: Comparative Studies, edited by Sir Edmund Leach, S.N. Mukherjee and John O. Ward, 175–196. Sydney: Sydney Studies in Society and Culture.
 Martin, Nicolas. 2015. Politics, landlords and Islam in Pakistan. Routledge India.

External links
 ALL THINGS PAKISTAN
 Massive peasant conference demands end of feudalism
 Feudalism in Pakistan by Asian Human Right Commission

 
Society of Pakistan
Debt bondage in South Asia